HMS Lion was a 64-gun third-rate ship of the line of the Royal Navy, of the , launched on 3 September 1777 at Portsmouth Dockyard.

Career

American Revolutionary War
She fought at the Battle of Grenada under Captain William Cornwallis on 6 July 1779, where she was badly damaged and forced to run downwind to Jamaica. She remained on the Jamaica station for the next year.

On 20 March 1780, Lion fought an action in company with two other ships against a French convoy off Monte Cristi, Dominican Republic, protected by Toussaint-Guillaume Picquet de la Motte's squadron. The Lion and Cornwallis, then returned Nelson to England. On 20 June, a second action by Cornwallis, took place near Bermuda, when Cornwallis' Lion, accompanied by five other ships of the line, met another French convoy carrying six thousand troops for Rhode Island, and protected by Charles-Henri-Louis d'Arsac de Ternay. The French were too strong for Cornwallis's squadron, but were content to continue with their mission instead of attacking the smaller British force.

French Revolutionary Wars
In late July 1793, under the command of Captain Sir Erasmus Gower, Lion escorted the East Indiaman , which carried the British ambassador Lord Macartney on his way to visit the Qianlong Emperor of China (the Macartney embassy).

On their way they stopped at New Amsterdam Island or Île Amsterdam. There they found a gang of seal fur hunters under the command of Pierre François Péron. Later, Lion captured the French ship Emélie, the vessel that had landed the sealers.

Between 1792 and 1794 she carried Lord George Macartney on a special embassy to China.  The embassy proceeded to the Bohai Gulf, off the Hai River. The ambassador and his party were conveyed up river by light craft to Tianjin before proceeding by land to Beijing On reaching Tianjin, Macartney sent orders to Lion to proceed to Japan, but because of sickness among the crew she was unable to do so.  The embassy rejoined Lion at Canton in December 1793. The ship's journal from this voyage is in the library of Cornell University.

In 1796, she visited Cape Town; in 1797, her crew were among those who joined the Mutiny at the Nore. In 1798, now under the command of Sir Manley Dixon, Lion fought a squadron of Spanish frigates at the action of 15 July 1798 and captured .

In July 1807 in the Malacca Strait she successfully protected from the French frigate , without an engagement, a convoy homeward bound from China.

On 27 December 1807 Lion captured the French privateer lugger Reciprocité off Beachy Head. She was from Dieppe, had a crew of 45 men, and was armed with 14 guns. Lion sent her into the Downs.

In 1811, under the command of Captain Henry Heathcote, Lion was one of a large fleet of ships involved in the capture of Java from Dutch forces.

On 26 January 1812 Commander Henderson Bain of  became acting captain of Lion. Bain returned to command of Harpy a few weeks before he received promotion to post captain 6 April 1813.

Lion was converted to a sheer hulk in September 1816, following the end of the Napoleonic wars.

Fate
Lion was sold to be broken up at Chatham on 30 November 1837.

Citations and references
Citations

References

Earnshaw, John (1959) Thomas Muir Scottish Martyr (NSW:The Stone Copying Company).
Lavery, Brian (2003) The Ship of the Line – Volume 1: The development of the battlefleet 1650–1850. Conway Maritime Press. .

External links
 

 

Ships of the line of the Royal Navy
Worcester-class ships of the line
1777 ships